The following is a sample of character portrayals of Ulysses S. Grant in popular entertainment.

Film

Grant is the third most popular American president to be portrayed in movies, films, or cinema, his character appearing in 35 movies. He is often portrayed as a drunkard, which is historically inaccurate. Portrayals include:
 The Birth of a Nation (1915), played by Donald Crisp
 E. Alyn Warren played Grant in
 Abraham Lincoln (1930)
 Secret Service (1931)
 Operator 13 (1934)
 Joseph Crehan played Grant in
Union Pacific (1939)
They Died with their Boots On (1941)
The Adventures of Mark Twain (1944)
Silver River (1948)
 Tennessee Johnson (1942), played by Harrison Greene
 From the Earth to the Moon (1958), played by Morris Ankrum 
 How the West Was Won (1962), played by Harry Morgan
 The Legend of the Lone Ranger (1981), played by Jason Robards
 Wild Wild West (1999), played by Kevin Kline
 Jonah Hex (2010), played by Aidan Quinn
 Lincoln (2012), played by Jared Harris
 Field of Lost Shoes (2014), played by Tom Skerritt

Television
 Wagon Train, "The Colter Craven Story", aired November 23, 1960, portrayed by Paul Birch
 The Wild Wild West, aired on CBS, 1965–1969, portrayed by Roy Engel
 Branded, "The Assassins: Part One", aired March 27, 1966, portrayed by William Bryant "The Assassins: Part Two", aired April 3, 1966, portrayed by William Bryant
 Lincoln, 1974, portrayed by Norman Burton
 The Life and Times of Grizzly Adams, aired on NBC, 1978, in its episode 2-20 "The Stranger" shows a young Captain Grant, portrayed by Mark Slade.
 The Blue and the Gray, aired on CBS, 1982, portrayed by Rip Torn
 North and South, 1985-1986/1994, portrayed by Mark Moses, Anthony Zerbe and Rutherford Cravens
 Lincoln, 1988, portrayed by James Gammon
 The Civil War, aired on PBS, 1990, voiced by Jason Robards
 Lincoln, aired on PBS, 1992, portrayed by Rod Steiger
 Dr. Quinn, Medicine Woman,
 The Day Lincoln Was Shot, aired on TNT, 1998, portrayed by John Ashton.
 Bury My Heart at Wounded Knee, aired on HBO, 2007, portrayed by Senator Fred Thompson.
 Sherman's March, aired on the History Channel, 2007, portrayed by Harry Bulkeley
 Hell on Wheels, aired on AMC, 2013-2016, portrayed by Victor Slezak
 Timeless, "The Assassination of Abraham Lincoln", aired October 10, 2016, portrayed by Terry Lewis
 Legends of Tomorrow, "Abominations", aired November 3, 2016, portrayed by John Churchill
 Grant, a History Channel miniseries which aired from May 25-27, 2020, portrayed by Justin Salinger. In the History Channel miniseries Abraham Lincoln which aired February 20-22, 2022, Salinger reprised his portrayal of Grant in the third episode, entitled "Saving the Union."

Notes

External links

Cultural depictions of Ulysses S. Grant